Alonso de Fonseca y Ulloa (also Alonso I de Fonseca) (died 1473) was a Roman Catholic prelate who served as Bishop of Ávila (1445–1454), Archbishop of Seville (1454–1465 and 1469–1473), and Archbishop of Santiago de Compostela (1465–1469).

Biography
In 1445, Alonso de Fonseca y Ulloa was appointed by the King of Spain and confirmed by Pope Eugene IV as Bishop of Ávila.
On 4 February 1454, he was appointed by Pope Nicholas V as Archbishop of Seville. 
In 1465, he was appointed by Pope Paul II as Archbishop of Santiago de Compostela. 
In 1469, he was appointed by Pope Paul II to his prior position as Archbishop of Seville where he served until his death in 1473.

While bishop, he was the principal co-consecrator of Pedro González de Mendoza, Bishop of Calahorra y La Calzada (1454).

References

External links and additional sources
 (for Chronology of Bishops) 
 (for Chronology of Bishops) 
 (for Chronology of Bishops) 
 (for Chronology of Bishops) 
 (for Chronology of Bishops) 
 (for Chronology of Bishops) 

1473 deaths
15th-century Roman Catholic archbishops in Castile
Bishops appointed by Pope Eugene IV
Bishops appointed by Pope Nicholas V
Bishops appointed by Pope Paul II